Singaporean Canadians are Canadians of Singaporean descent. There is a small community of Singaporeans in Canada, consisting largely of expatriate professionals and immigrants from Singapore and their families, as well as international students.

Migration history 
During the 1970s, arrivals to Canada from Singapore numbered less than 100 per year while in the following decade, immigrants born in Singapore averaged between 200 and 400. In the years 1989–91, arrivals from Singapore approached 1,000.

Many Singaporeans are employed by Canadian companies or in the public sector, including universities. They also figure prominently among medical doctors, accountants, engineers, and architects. Approximately one-third are self-employed and have entered Canada under that category or as entrepreneurs. Most of their businesses are urban-based and often have a highly technical focus, such as computers or chemical and engineering products. Most Singaporeans in Canada tend to retain their citizenship in anticipation of possible return.

Between 1987 and 1991, some 1,500 to 1,800 Singaporean students were living in Canada.

Notable people 
 Justin Trudeau – Prime Minister of Canada, 5x great–grandson of William Farquhar, the 1st Resident of Singapore.
 Yuen Pau Woo – Politician
 Chloe Ing – Figure skater
 Thea Lim – Writer
 Shin Lim – Magician
 Jonathan Seet – Singer-songwriter
 Goh Poh Seng – Dramatist, novelist and poet
 Steph Song – Actress
 Victor Oh – Politician

See also 

 Canada–Singapore relations

References 

Ethnic groups in Canada
Asian Canadian
 
Canada